Brother Dr. René P. E. Stockman, F.C. (born May 13, 1954 in Assenede, Belgium) is the Superior General of the Congregation of the Brothers of Charity since 2000. He is a Belgian specialist in psychiatric caregiving.

Education
René Stockman studied at the Saint-Laurens Institute in Zelzate between 1966 and 1972.  He finished grammar school with a diploma in economics.

In 1972 he joined the Congregation of the Brothers of Charity. He then started in Ghent his training as a nurse at the Higher Institute for Paramedic Professions (1973–1976).

He continued with studies leading to a Master in medical and social sciences and management of hospitals at the University of Louvain (1977–1980). His thesis was entitled Organization of mental health-care in Rwanda and Burundi. Additionally he obtained a teaching certificate for teaching in higher secondary schools (1981), at the University of Louvain. He completed his education by obtaining a doctors degree at the Catholic University of Louvain. His thesis was entitled: The place of the religious within the mental health care and obtained high examination marks (1986).

Professional activities
Brother René Stockman began his professional activities in 1976, as chief of the department of health care at the psychiatric institute of Sint-Julian Ghent (now the Dr. Guislain Institute).  He pursued this mission until 1977.

From 1980 until 1987 he was director of the Institute for Psychiatric Nursing Dr. Guislain in Ghent and in 1982-1988 he was the managing director of the Institute Dr. Guislain.

In 1988 he was made the general manager of all institutions of the Brothers of Charity in Belgium which are active within the sectors of health care and orthopedagogic care. He pursued in this capacity until 1994.In 1994 he was made superior of the province Saint-Vincent (Belgium) of the Brothers of Charity. In 2000 he was elected general superior of the Brothers. From then on he resided mainly in Rome, travelling extensively throughout the world.

He was reelected in 2006 for a second term of six years, in 2012 for a third term and in 2018 for a fourth term.

Other activities
 1976-2000: chief editor of the magazine Psychiatrie en Verpleging (Psychiatry and Health Care),
 from 1980 on: lecturer at the Institute of Psychiatric Health Care in Ghent,
 from 1983 on: secretary and from 1989 on chairman of the Intecongregational Centre for concerted action of health care,
 from 1984 on: director of the High School for Congregational Health care institutes,
 from 1986 on: curator of the Museum Dr. Guislain in Ghent,
 from 1986 on: director of the Education Centre Guislain Ghent,
 1988 - 2000: director of Caritas Oost-Vlaanderen,
 1988 - 2000: director of different health care institutions,
 1989 - 2000: director of Verbond van Vlaamse Verzorgingsinstellingen (VVI),
 1989 - 2000: director of Caritas Catholica Flanders,
 from 1989 on: chairman of the Committee for the missions of the Brothers of Charity and of Caraes non-governmental organization for developing aid,
 from 1990 on: editor in chief of the magazine of the Congregation Van Harte,
 from 1990 on: advisor-lecturer Faculty of medicine, Catholic University Louvain,
 from 1993 on: chairman of the non profit organization Fracaritatis VZW, centre for international cooperation,
 1996 - 2000: chairman of the Association of Superiors of religious orders and congregations in Belgium,
 from 1997 on: member of the Supreme Council of UFSIA, Antwerp,
 from 1998 on: visiting professor EHSAL, Brussels,
 from 1998 on: visiting professor Kigali Health Institute, Kigali,
 from 2000 on: visiting professor Catholic University of America, Washington,
 from 2000 on: visiting professor Pontifical University Lateran, Rome,
 from 2001 on: editor in chief of the magazine of the congregation Deus Caritas Est.

Honors
 Knight of the Order of the Holy Sepulchre, Belgian branch (1996).
 Commander in the Order of Leopold (2013)

Publications

In English
 Praying with Father Triest, Broeders van Liefde, Gent, 1992
 Neither rhyme nor reason, history of psychiatry,  Museum Dr. Guislain, Ghent, 1997,
 In the school of love - retreat about our life as Brothers of Charity,  October 2001
 Father Triest - 20 meditations, 2001
 Father Triest for every day, 2001
 God makes history with people, 2002
 A harbour of wordsbloemlezing uit de geschriften van Vader Triest, 2002
 Peter Joseph Triest. On His Way to Sainthood , Gompel&Svacina, 2019

In French
 Ni rime ni raison, histoire de la psychiatrie, Museum Dr. Guislain, Ghent, 1997
 Le Père Triest - 20 meditations, 2001
 Le Père Triest au quotidien A l’abri des paroles bloemlezing uit de geschriften van Vader Triest
 A la lumière de Marie, Halewijn, Anvers, 2004
 Pierre Joseph Triest. En chemin vers la sainteté, Gompel&Svacina, 2019

In Dutch
 Plaats van de religieuzen in de geestelijke gezondheidszorg, Uitgeverij Acco, Leuven, 1983
 Deontologie voor verpleegkundigen, Uitgeverij Aurelia - Paramedica, Gent, 1984
 Mijmeringen bij de geschiedenis van het Guislaininstituut, Uitgave Museum Dr. Guislain, Gent, 1987
 De Kerk en het verstoorde leven, Uitgeverij Lannoo, Tielt, 1988,
 Geen rede mee te rijmen. Geschiedenis van de psychiatrie, Uitgeverij Aurelia-Paramedica, 1989
 Beroepsethiek voor de verpleegkundige, Uitgeverij Aurelia-Paramedica, 1990
 Hoopvol op weg - Toekomstig beheer van congregationele gezondheidsinstellingen, Uitgeverij Acco, 1991
 Vastenheiligen, wondermeisjes en hongerkunstenaars, Uitgave Museum Dr. Guislain, Gent, 1991
 Bidden met Vader Triest, Broeders van Liefde, Gent, 1992
 Prof. André Prims, zoals we hem kennen en waarderen, Liber amicorum prof. André Prims
 Het beheer van congregationele gezondheidsinstellingen: historische achtergronden en toekomstperspectieven
 De vis heeft geen weet van het water, Een ethiek van het onvolkomene, Uitgeverij Pelckmans, 1995
 Het welzijn van de zorg, Acco, Leuven, 1996
 Zorg op maat en met een gelaat, Uitgeverij Garant, 1996
 Gezocht Gezicht, Uitgave Museum Dr. Guislain, Gent, 1996
 Met recht en rede - Waanzin tussen Wet en Kabinet, Uitgave Museum Dr. Guislain, Gent, 1997
 Bij de Heer zijn: gebedenboek van de Broeders van Liefde,  Lannoo, Tielt, 1997
 Uw hand in mijn hand - Gebeden voor onderweg, Lannoo, Tielt, 1997
 De goede mijnheer Triest: een biografie van Kanunnik Peter Joseph Triest, 1998
 Het beroepsgeheim in de zorgverleningssector, Uitg. Intersentia, redactie, 1998
 Bouwen aan een spiritualiteit van gelukkig zijn, 4 audio-cassettes uitgegeven door het Dr. Anna Terruwe Centrum.
 Religieus leven nu en morgen, in: Redactie verslagboek VHOB-URB-colloquium 6-7/11/1998
 De maat van de liefde is liefde zonder maat,  Davidsfonds, Leuven, 1999
 Van nar tot patiënt,  Davidsfonds, Leuven, 2000
 Waar is in een bureaucratische cultuur de patiënt gebleven?, in: Hoe komt het dat ethici verschillend denken?  Schijnwerper op de cultuur - Dr. W.J. Eijk, Dr. J.P.M Lelkens (ed.),  Colombia, Oestgeest (NL), 2000, Hoofdstuk IX: p. 143-151.
 Uit handen gegeven, icoon van de schepping, Halewijn, Antwerpen.  2000
 Denken voor Vlaanderen - Over levenskwaliteit, Davidsfonds, Leuven, 2001, p. 75-88
 Vader Triest - 20 meditaties, 2001
 Vader Triest voor elke dag, 2001
 A. Demeulemeester: een schildersleven.  Ode aan de vriendschap, 2001, p. 83-87.
 Rede en waanzin.  Museum Dr. Guislain.  De ontwikkeling van de morele behandeling in België of het ontstaan van de gestichtspsychiatrie, 2001, p. 141-185
 In woorden geborgen - bloemlezing uit de geschriften van Vader Triest, 2002
 Maria in het licht - Icoon van het leven van de Moeder Gods,  Halewijn, Antwerpen, 2003
 Ubi Caritas - Godgewijd leven,  Carmelitana, Gent, 2003
 Triest, een vader voor velen,  Brothers of Charity Publications, Gent, 2003
 Uitdagingen voor de paus, in: Habemus Papam, het profiel van de volgende paus, Rik Torfs en Kurt Martens (ed.), Leuven, Davidsfonds, 2004, p. 128-132
 Liefde en barmhartigheid als weg van de bevestiging, in: Bevestiging, erfdeel en opdracht, Uitg. Damon Budel, 2004, p. 396-415.
 Schatten van mensen, Halewijn, Antwerpen, 2004
 Weten in wiens dienst ik sta, in: Guido Deblaere, innovator en inspirator, Lannoo, Tielt, 2004, p. 99-102
 Leiderschap in dienstbaarheid, de spiritualiteit van het leidinggeven, Lannoo, Tielt, 2004
 Mag ik je broeder noemen?  Religieuze broeders voor vandaag, Halewijn, Antwerpen, 2004
 Met de ogen van je hart, Halewijn, Antwerpen, 2004
 Triest Tour, 2005
 Brandde ons hart niet?, Davidsfonds, 2006
 Over een God die Liefde is, Halewijn, 2006
 Vincentius a Paulo, 2006
 Liefde in actie. 200 jaar Broeders van Liefde, Davidsfonds, 2007
 Pro Deo, Pelckmans, 2008
 Voor God alleen, Pelckmans, 2008
 Vincentius achterna, onze voorkeursoptie voor de armen, Halewijn, 2009
 Naar den Congo. 100 jaar Broeders van Liefde in Congo, Halewijn, 2011
 Laat niet verloren gaan één mensenkind, Gompel&Svacina, 2018
 Zoektocht naar de ware vreugde. Een wandeling doorheen de zaligsprekingen, Gompel&Svacina, 2019
 Petrus Jozef Triest. Op weg naar heiligheid, Gompel&Svacina, 2019

In Romanian
 Manual de nursing psichiatric, Bucuresti, 2004

External links 
 Website Brothers of Charity worldwide
 Website Brothers of Charity Belgium
 History of the Brothers of Charity
 Website Museum Dr. Guislain

1954 births
Living people
Brothers of Charity
Knights of the Holy Sepulchre
People from Assenede